Route nationale 9 (RN 9) is a secondary highway in Madagascar of 382  km, running from Toliara to Mandabe. It crosses the regions of Menabe and Atsimo-Andrefana.

The section between Toliara and Analamisampy of 107 km had been paved recently.

Also over the Mangoky river a bridge will be constructed. It will be the longest bridge of Madagascar with 880 m.

Selected locations on route
(north to south)
Mandabe
Maharivo River crossing
Manja
 near Tanambao Ambony - Mangoky River crossing and Lake Ihotry
-intersection with RN55 to Morombe
Befandriana Sud
Antanimeva
river crossing near Ambalavenoka
Reniala Reserve
Ifaty
Fiherenana River crossing
Toliara  (Tuléar)

See also
List of roads in Madagascar
Transport in Madagascar

References

Roads in Atsimo-Andrefana
Roads in Madagascar
Roads in Menabe